Yuhi IV Gahindiro was the King of Rwanda from 1792 to 1802. He was the head of Bahindiro clan and father of Mutara II Rwogera. His reign is remembered in Rwandan history as the most peaceful. He died with no blood on his hands.

His other recorded children were Nyirindekwe, Nkusi, Rubega, Rwanyanya, Rwayega,
Rwabika, Nyabigondo, Nkoronko, Mutijima, Nyamashara, Rubamburamanzi, Mashara and Urujeni. Yuhi IV Gahindiro's mother was called, Nyiratunga was her Empress, so she took power because her son was an infant. History tells us that he handed over power to his son about twenty years ago. The landlord has joined forces with his brother Rugagi, the ancestor of the wealthy Kajeguhakwa Valens. As soon as the landlord died, his mother-in-law, Nyiratamba, the mother of Mibambwe Sentabyo, presented him with cows called Ibiheko as a token of his gratitude, otherwise he drank and gave because he would not continue to live in the new kingdom as the mystery had commanded.

Gahindiro was one of the four most famous Nyinginya kings, namely: Ruganzu Ndoli; Cyilima Rujugira; Yuhi Gahindiro and Kigeli Rwabugili. Gahindiro is the one who broke the popular proverb: "Ak'i Muhana comes after the rain." In the poems when they reach Gahindiro they say: "Gahindiro of Nyiratunga the widow of Gihana Rurema created him and sent him a shield thanks to his father Mibambwe Sentabyo from generation to generation."

Gahindiro deployed a large number of troops, but it began mainly during the reign of Cyilima II, when they set up camps due to the fact that at that time Burundi was waging a major war against Rwanda seeking to overthrow the Bicura. of Rwaka who had taken refuge there and Rugira. Gahindiro changed the culture so that the units of the previous dynasties were not as old as the other dynasties, but were instead run by the courts or parishes. As members of the armed forces aged, they were replaced by their sons. Each camp was a large house made up of warriors and their servants or war companions. It consisted of at least two heads, one made up of 120 combatants.

Yuhi IV died of old age.

References

Rwandan kings
1802 deaths
1746 births